Marora Stadium is the main sports venue of Yapen Islands Regency, Papua. It has a maximum seating capacity of 5,000.

References

Multi-purpose stadiums in Indonesia
Buildings and structures in Papua (province)
Football venues in Indonesia
Sports venues in Indonesia
Perseru Serui